Mokhtar Al-Shanqiti (born May 25, 1985) is a Saudi football player who plays a winger. He played in the Pro League for Al-Ansar.

References

1985 births
Living people
Saudi Arabian footballers
Al-Ansar FC (Medina) players
Al-Tai FC players
Al-Watani Club players
Ohod Club players
Al-Ula FC players
Saudi First Division League players
Saudi Professional League players
Saudi Fourth Division players
Association football wingers